Grace Lister (born 27 May 2004) is an English international cyclist. She has represented England at the Commonwealth Games.

Biography
Lister rode for Wolverhampton Wheelers before joining Brother UK-Orientation Marketing. She started riding aged 6 and joined the British Cycling programme in 2021. She won the gold medal at the 2022 British National Track Championships in the team pursuit.

In 2022, she was selected for the 2022 Commonwealth Games in Birmingham. She competed in two events; the women's individual pursuit race, finishing in 14th place and the women's scratch race.

Lister won her second national title at the 2023 British Cycling National Track Championships, she won the team purusit title for the second time.

References

2004 births
Living people
British female cyclists
British track cyclists
Cyclists at the 2022 Commonwealth Games
Commonwealth Games competitors for England